Señora de Sorolla in Black is an early 20th-century painting by Spanish artist Joaquín Sorolla. It is part of the collection of the Metropolitan Museum of Art in New York.

Done in oil on canvas, the work depicts Clotilde García del Castillo, Sorolla's wife, confidante, travel companion and muse. The painting shows Clotilde wearing a black dress in their Madrid home. In the background, Sorolla has rendered a smaller version of one of his earlier paintings.

The work is on view at The Metropolitan Museum in Gallery 827.

See also
Clotilde García del Castillo (painting)
Walk on the Beach

References 

Paintings in the collection of the Metropolitan Museum of Art
1906 paintings
Paintings by Joaquín Sorolla